Anthering is a municipality in the district of Salzburg-Umgebung in the state of Salzburg in Austria.

Geography
Anthering lies north of the Salzburg basin. The Salzach forms the western boundary, which is also the border with Bavaria. On the east is the small town of Seekirchen am Wallersee.

References

Cities and towns in Salzburg-Umgebung District